Edward Holtz (July 17, 1899 – July 8, 1924) was an American Negro league infielder between 1919 and 1924.

A native of Evansville, Indiana, Holtz made his Negro leagues debut in 1919 with the St. Louis Giants. He remained with the club (later called the "Stars") through 1924, and also played with the Lincoln Giants in 1923. Holtz died in St. Louis, Missouri in 1924 at age 24.

References

External links
 and Baseball-Reference Black Baseball stats and Seamheads

1899 births
1924 deaths
Lincoln Giants players
St. Louis Giants players
St. Louis Stars (baseball) players
20th-century African-American sportspeople
Baseball infielders